The Anglican Diocese of Ifo is one of the 13 Dioceses within the Anglican Province of Lagos, itself one of the 14 provinces within the Church of Nigeria. The pioneer Bishop, the Rt. Rev'd J. Akin. Odejide retired in October 2012 and the current Bishop is the Rt. Rev'd Nathaniel Oladejo Ogundipe. The diocese was created from the Diocese of Egba and inaugurated on 12 March 2007.

References

Church of Nigeria dioceses
Dioceses of the Province of Lagos